Jacobs Solutions Inc. is an American international technical professional services firm. The company provides engineering, technical, professional and construction services, as well as scientific and specialty consulting for a broad range of clients globally, including companies, organizations, and government agencies. Jacobs has consistently ranked No. 1 on both Engineering News-Record (ENR)'s 2018, 2019, 2020 and 2021 Top 500 Design Firms and Trenchless Technology’s 2018, 2019, 2020 and 2021 Top 50 Trenchless Engineering Firms. Its worldwide annual revenue reached over $14 billion in the 2021 fiscal year, and earnings rose to $477 million.

Overview

Jacobs Engineering was founded in 1947, by Joseph J. Jacobs. The company's current Chief Executive Officer is Bob Pragada. He has been the CEO since January 2023. Steve Demetriou, the CEO from 2015 to 2023, now serves as the Executive Chair. The previous President and CEO was Craig L. Martin from 2006 until 2014.

The company is publicly traded as a Fortune 500 company. As of September 2018, Jacobs had more than 80,800 employees globally, and more than 400 offices in North America, South America, Europe, the Middle East, Australia, Africa, and Asia.

In October 2016, the company moved its headquarters from Pasadena, California to Dallas, Texas.

On August 9, 2017, the Pentagon awarded a $4.6 billion Integrated Research & Development for Enterprise Solutions (IRES) follow-on contract to Jacobs Technology Inc, a unit of Jacobs Engineering Group Inc. to provide products and services for the Missile Defense Agency and its Missile Defense Integration and Operations Center.

In October 2018, Jacobs agreed to sell its Energy, Chemicals and Resources (ECR) segment to WorleyParsons.

In April 2021, the Institute on Taxation and Economic Policy listed the top 55 corporations that paid $0 in taxes for the year 2020. Jacobs Federal Income Taxes for that year were negative $37 million dollars for an Effective Tax Rate of −17.4%.

Acquisitions
In FY 2007, Jacobs acquired the privately held planning, engineering and design firm, Edwards and Kelcey for an undisclosed amount.

In FY 2008, Jacobs spent $264 million to acquire Carter and Burgess, Lindsey Engineering and a 60% stake in Zamel and Turbag Consulting Engineers. In FY 2010, Jacobs acquired TechTeam, Tybrin and Jordan, Jones and Goulding for $259.5 million total.

In FY 2014, Jacobs announced it completed a merger transaction with Sinclair Knight Merz (SKM), a 6,900-person professional services firm headquartered in Australia. The purchase price reflects an enterprise value of AUS$1.2 billion (US$1.1 billion) plus adjustments for cash, debt and other items.

On August 2, 2017, Jacobs acquired CH2M Hill – a global engineering firm in key infrastructure and government service sectors, including water, transportation, environmental and nuclear in a $3.27 billion cash-and-stock deal.

In March 2020, Jacobs acquired Wood Nuclear, the nuclear services arm of UK-based John Wood Group, for £250 million, adding 2000 staff and bringing Jacobs' total UK workforce to almost 11,000.

In December 2020, Jacobs announced it would be investing in the UK based company PA Consulting in a deal valued at £1.825 billion. Completion of the deal is expected to take place by the end of Q1 2021.

On February 7, 2022, Jacobs announced it would enter into a joint venture with the Qatar based entity Locus Engineering Management and Services Co. W.L.L, an Asset Management company with interests in Building Maintenance, Infrastructure, Oil and Gas Support Services and Engineering. The terms of the venture were not disclosed at the time of announcement.

Controversies

Kingston coal ash cleanup 
The Kingston Fossil Plant coal fly ash slurry spill was an environmental and industrial disaster that occurred on Monday December 22, 2008, when a dike ruptured at a coal ash pond at the Tennessee Valley Authority's Kingston Fossil Plant in Roane County, Tennessee, releasing  of coal fly ash slurry. TVA hired Jacobs Engineering to clean up the spill. In the years following the spill at the cleanup site, a number of workers suffered health effects.

As early as 2012, workers began to report illnesses that they believed were caused by the cleanup, and by the ten year anniversary of the event, hundreds of workers had been sickened and more than 30 had died.

In 2013, 50 workers and their families filed a lawsuit against contractor Jacobs Engineering. They were represented by Knoxville lawyer James K. Scott. This lawsuit was dismissed by judge Thomas A. Varlan, chief justice for the U.S. District Court for the Eastern District of Tennessee the following year. This ruling was reversed by the U.S. Court of Appeals for the Sixth Circuit after evidence was discovered that Jacobs Engineering had misled the workers about the dangers of coal ash.

A federal jury ruled in favor of the workers seeking compensation in November 2018. The ruling held that Jacobs Engineering had failed to keep the workers safe from environmental hazards, and had misled them about the dangers of coal ash, mainly by claiming that extra protective equipment, such as masks and protective clothing, was unnecessary.

In a phase two of the trial, the Kingston cleanup workers will be able to seek damages. In April 2020, 52 workers rejected a $10 million settlement offered by Jacobs Engineering.

Hinkley Point 

Jacobs Engineering is constructing the Hinkley Point C nuclear reactor, controversial for the reason of its excessive delays and cost overruns. “It’s three times over cost and three times over time where it’s been built in Finland and France,” said Paul Dorfman of UCL Energy Institute. The companies involved have been accused of a conflict of interest as the company advising the UK about cost management was owned by Jacobs Engineering, while Jacobs was working for the company managing the project EDF. In other words, a subsidiary of a company hired by EDF was advising the UK how much money to grant EDF.

In 2015, Greenpeace, the state of Austria, and nine German and Austrian utility companies, sued the European Commission for approving the deal, contending that state aid was unfair. “Nuclear power is the technology of the past. We should not keep it alive artificially with government subsidies,” said Andrä Rupprechter, Austria's minister of agriculture and forestry.

In 2021 a study found that Hinkley Point C would pump up 120,000 liters of seawater a second from the Severn Estuary, killing an estimated 182 million fish a year.

Woonsocket Regional Wastewater Treatment Facility 

The Rhode Island Department of Environmental Management is investigating this Jacobs-run plant for spillage of an estimated 10 million gallons of wastewater with incomplete treatment into the Blackstone River in June 2022. Previous investigations resulted in letters of noncompliance issued to Jacobs in 2021 and 2020.

See also

Top 100 Contractors of the U.S. federal government

References

External links

1947 establishments in California
Companies listed on the New York Stock Exchange
Companies based in Dallas
Construction and civil engineering companies of the United States
Construction and civil engineering companies established in 1947
American companies established in 1947
Engineering consulting firms of the United States
International engineering consulting firms
Multinational companies headquartered in the United States